Gweru Urban is a constituency of the National Assembly of the Parliament of Zimbabwe. It contains the city of Gweru in Midlands Province. Its current MP since 2018 is Brian Dube of the Movement for Democratic Change Alliance.

Members 
A constituency called Gwelo (the town's colonial name until 1982) was represented in the Parliament of Rhodesia from 1914 until 1979.

Note: In the 1990 and 1995 elections, the constituency was called Gweru Central.

References 

Gweru
Parliamentary constituencies in Zimbabwe